La vie commence demain is a 1950 French film directed by Nicole Védrès. It was the first X-rated film shown in the United Kingdom.  It was screened at the Regent Street Cinema in London in 1951.

References

External links

1950 films
1950s French-language films
Films directed by Nicole Védrès
French documentary films
1950 documentary films
French black-and-white films
1950s French films